Seleuco, re di Siria (Seleucus, King of Syria) is an opera seria in three acts by Francesco Bianchi. The libretto was by Mattia Botturini, after Antioco by Apostolo Zeno and Pietro Pariati, a libretto first set by Francesco Gasparini in 1705.

Marita P. McClymonds notes that the work "is significant for its several ensembles (one incorporating chorus and dance), its choruses (sometimes functioning as a 'character' in the drama) and its multi-sectional, action-emsemble finale."

Performance history
The opera was first performed at the Teatro San Benedetto in Venice on 26 December 1791.

Roles

Synopsis
Antioco agonizes between his loyalty to his father, Seleuco, and his love for his father's young bride Stratonice. Eventually the generosity of Seleuco resolves everything.

References

McClymonds, Marita P (1992), 'Seleuco, re di Siria' in The New Grove Dictionary of Opera, ed. Stanley Sadie (London) 

Opera seria
Operas by Francesco Bianchi
1791 operas
Italian-language operas
Operas